Hypercompe abdominalis is a moth of the family Erebidae. It is found in Brazil (Para, Minas Gerais, Rio de Janeiro).

Larvae have been recorded feeding on Brassica and Veronica species.

References

 

abdominalis
Moths described in 1865